Alfred Dock is a dock at Birkenhead, Merseyside, England.

History

In 1856, J. B. Hartley produced plans for alternative river access to the Great Float, as the Great Low Water Basin proved to be insufficient. Completed in 1866, the dock was named after Prince Alfred, Duke of Edinburgh, second son of Queen Victoria, and opened by him on 21 June 1866.

This provided much expanded access to the Birkenhead dock system, which was also served by an entrance channel further south via Morpeth Dock.

This meant the removal of a river lock entrance and an access channel to the Great Float, in order to reconstruct the remaining facilities. At the same time, a bascule bridge and a swing bridge were constructed over two remaining passages. The dock was arranged so that the whole dock could be used as a lock.

By the beginning of the 1980s, the remaining southern lock entrance had closed and was partly filled in. The redevelopment of Tower Road over a decade later precipitated in the removal of the swing bridge and the sealing up of the southern passage.

The north quayside of Alfred Dock was an open quay. The southern quayside was unallocated.

Present
Of the existing two river entrances, only the north locks remain operational. Tower Road, which links Birkenhead with the Seacombe area of Wallasey, divides Alfred Dock from the Great Float via a bascule bridge. This bridge is the last remaining of the former Four Bridges which crossed the dock system at this point.

References

Sources

External links

 Alfred Dock historical photo
   Alfred Dock aerial photo

Birkenhead docks
Maritime Transport in Merseyside